Paul Cox  is the current conductor of the Reading Youth Orchestra. He took on this role in 2006, succeeding Christopher Walker. Cox is also Head of Strings at Southampton University. He has broadcast on the BBC, Independent Radio Network and Swiss radio. He set up the Eureka Foundation in 1997 and is still serving the organisation as its chairman.

External links
 Paul Cox

British male conductors (music)
Living people
Year of birth missing (living people)
Place of birth missing (living people)
21st-century British conductors (music)
21st-century British male musicians